Robert H. Goddard High School (Goddard High School, GHS) is a public senior high school in Roswell, New Mexico, United States. It is a part of the Roswell Independent School District. Established in 1965, the school is named after rocket pioneer Robert Hutchings Goddard. The colors of GHS are navy blue, Columbia blue and white, and the school mascot is the Rocket.

History
The majority of classrooms at GHS are located underground. The school was completed in 1965 at the height of the Cold war. Walker Air Force Base, located on the south side of Roswell, was considered a major target for Soviet ballistic missiles. The classrooms were built underground so that the school could serve as a bomb shelter in the event of nuclear war. The gymnasiums, cafeteria, auditorium, and other larger rooms were built above ground, on top of the classrooms.

Academics

Student body statistics

Athletics

GHS competes in the New Mexico Activities Association, as a AAAA school in District 4. Their district includes Artesia High School and Roswell High School.

GHS has won 50 state championships since 1967.

Notable alumni
 Brandon Claussen, former MLB player (New York Yankees, Cincinnati Reds)
 Nancy Lopez (1975), professional golfer
 Gerina (Mendoza) Piller (2003), professional golfer

See also 
List of high schools in New Mexico
Roswell Independent School District
Roswell High School
University High School

References

External links 
 Official school webpage
 Goddard Rockets Football

Roswell, New Mexico
Schools in Chaves County, New Mexico
Public high schools in New Mexico